Ansel Galimov (born April 15, 1991) is a Russian professional ice hockey player. He is currently playing with HC Neftekhimik Nizhnekamsk in the Kontinental Hockey League (KHL).

Playing career
Galimov made his KHL debut playing with HC Neftekhimik Nizhnekamsk during the 2012–13 KHL season before playing with Metallurg Novokuznetsk in the KHL from September 2013 until April 2015.

After two seasons with Dynamo, Galimov, while still contracted, was granted free agent status from the KHL following the 2016–17 season, due to the club's debt on July 4, 2017. With Dynamo unwilling to offer an improved contract, Galimov left to sign a two-year contract with Avangard Omsk the following day on July 5, 2017.

On 8 May 2020, Galimov agreed to a one-year contract with his seventh KHL club in HC Sochi.

References

External links

1991 births
Living people
Avangard Omsk players
HC Dynamo Moscow players
Metallurg Novokuznetsk players
HC Neftekhimik Nizhnekamsk players
Russian ice hockey forwards
Severstal Cherepovets players
HC Sochi players
HC Spartak Moscow players
Tatar people of Russia
Tatar sportspeople
Volga Tatar people